Brasilia (minor planet designation: 293 Brasilia) is a large Main belt asteroid that was discovered by French astronomer Auguste Charlois on 20 May 1890 in Nice. It is the namesake of the Brasilia family, a smaller asteroid family of X-type asteroids in the outer main-belt. However, Brasilia is a suspected interloper in its own family.

Photometric observations of this asteroid at the Leura Observatory in Leura, Australia during 2006 gave a light curve with a period of 8.173 ± 0.002 hours and a brightness variation of 0.20 ± 0.03 in magnitude.

References

External links
 
 

Brasilia asteroids
Background asteroids
Brasilia
Brasilia
CX-type asteroids (Tholen)
18900520